Serine/threonine-protein kinase Nek3 is an enzyme that in humans is encoded by the NEK3 gene.

In Aspergillus nidulans, lack of the serine/threonine kinase NimA (never in mitosis A) results in cell cycle arrest in G2, while overexpression causes the premature onset of mitotic events. The protein encoded by this gene is similar in sequence to the Aspergillus nidulans protein and may therefore play a role in mitotic regulation. However, the encoded protein differs from other NimA family members in that it is not cell cycle regulated and is found primarily in the cytoplasm. Three transcript variants have been found for this gene, but the full-length nature of only two of them has been characterized.

References

Further reading

Human proteins